Jwamer Aga, was the head of the Kurdish tribe of Hamawand during the late nineteenth century Ottoman era, Jwamer was given the governorship of the Zuhab district after the overthrow of its hereditary ruling family the Bajalan.  Jwamer which means one who is descented from nobility or is noble.

Jwamer was assassinated in 1888 after he rebelled against the Persians. Jwamer held the Persian forces at Qasr-e Shirin for two months.

George Nathaniel Curzon notes that Jwamer was invited to a meeting with Tehran's emissary, where he was slain. Jwamer is considered an early Kurdish nationalist figure by the citizens of the Kurdistan Region, A village was named in his honour in the northernmost part of the Kifri district in the Diyala Province.

Former KDP Secretary General Ibrahim Ahmad named the main character in his famed nationalistic novel Jani Gal in reference to Jwamer

Notes

References
Ehsan Yar-Shater Encyclopaedia Iranica Bibliotheca Persica Press, 2003 
Cecil John Edmonds "Kurds, Turks, and Arabs: politics, travel, and research in north-eastern Iraq, 1919-1925" Oxford University Press, 1957 
Yona Sabar "A Jewish Neo-Aramaic dictionary" Otto Harrassowitz Verlag, 2002 

Year of birth missing
1888 deaths
Assassinated Iraqi Kurdistani politicians